Very Best or The Very Best may refer to

The Very Best (band), a London-based Afro-Western music trio
The Very Best (Earth, Wind & Fire album), 1994
The Very Best (INXS album), 2011
Very Best, an album by V6, 2001
"Very Best", a song by Rick Ross from Black Market, 2015

See also
The Very Best Of (disambiguation)